Sunset Reservoir is one of three terminal reservoirs  in the Regional Water System in San Francisco, California. The reservoir, the city's largest, is located in the Sunset District at 24th Avenue and Ortega Street, and is owned and maintained by the San Francisco Public Utilities Commission.

Seismic upgrades 
 Seismic rehabilitation, which would include stabilization of the soil dam embankment (completed); a retrofit of the walls and roof using seismic joints, shear walls, diagonal bracing, and struts; and foundation improvements.
 General rehabilitation, which would include repairing deteriorated concrete, replacing part of the reservoir lining material, replacing inlet piping, installing security fencing, upgrading the landscaping, and other miscellaneous site improvements.

Solar project 

The Sunset Reservoir Solar Project has installed 25,000 solar panels on the  roof of the reservoir. The 5-megawatt plant more than tripled the city's 2-megawatt solar generation capacity. It opened in December 2010 in a ceremony introduced by Mayor Gavin Newsom.

See also

 List of lakes in California
 List of lakes in the San Francisco Bay Area

References

External links
 
 San Francisco Public utilities Commission official website
  (begins at 00:05:33)

Reservoirs in San Francisco
Sunset District, San Francisco
Reservoirs in California
Reservoirs in Northern California